RK Vardar 1961 is a professional handball club from Skopje, Republic of Macedonia. Vardar is the most successful handball team in the country, having won fifteen national League and Cup titles. Also, Vardar is the most successful team in the regional SEHA League having won five titles. The team has also won two EHF Champions League titles.

History

RK Vardar was founded in 1961, as part of the Vardar Sports Club in Skopje, which had been founded in 1947. 

The RK Grafichar Skopje club was established in 1948, which in terms of rank and quality was right behind Rabotnichki. In 1961 Grafichar renamed itself to Vardar and almost the entire team of the club RK Partizan Skopje joined the team. Skopje's club Rabotnichki began to experience a crisis and was no longer the strong first league team from the past, and a more ambitious club Vardar entered the scene. A solid team was created, the mainstays were goalkeeper Jovanovski, as well as Atanasovski, Zdravkovski,  Savevski and Bozinovski. 

This talent promised a good future and with coach Boskos, who was armed with great knowledge gained in at the time handball superpower Romania, where he lived until moving to Macedonia.
Everything was done ambitiously and after all the obstacles were overcome and the fiercest opponents were defeated in 1976, Vardar joined the first division. They played there for 2 seasons, while in the 80s they spent most of the time in the second division. 

The handball team rose to power again in the late 1990s becoming one of the two clubs, alongside RK Pelister, to dominate the Macedonian handball scene after the independence of the country.

Vardar have participated in the EHF Champions League eleven times and made it to the semifinals of the Cup Winner's Cup three times. Except for 2005, when they came in 4th place, the club has achieved either championship or runner-up in the Macedonian Super League since 1999. They achieved a record win of the Macedonian handball championship by winning their twelfth title in 2018 and are the record cup winner with thirteen victories. On 15 April 2012, Vardar defeated Metalurg at the Zagreb Arena to become the first SEHA League champion. The team has won five titles in the SEHA League. The club started the new 2013–14 season with a new management structure, Sergey Samsonenko as the new proprietor and sport director of the club, while Mihajlo Mihajlovski has become the honorary club chairman.

The season of 2016–17 was the most successful for the team because they managed to win the EHF Champions League and the regional SEHA League including the two main domestic championships, the national Handball Super League and the national Handball Cup. Two days after winning the EHF Champions League the team celebrated the victory with approximately 150,000 people in a ceremony on the Macedonia Square in Skopje. Because of the huge success, Gjorgje Ivanov, at the time President of the Republic of Macedonia, awarded the members of the handball club Vardar a Medal of Merit for the results they achieved, especially for winning the Champions League title. The club was awarded the national charter of the country.

In the 2018–19 season, the team once again managed to win the EHF Champions League, the regional SEHA League and the main domestic championship, the Handball Super League of North Macedonia. One day after winning the EHF Champions League the team arrived in the country with a private jet and celebrated the victory with approximately 250,000 people in a central ceremony at the Macedonia Square in Skopje.

Kits

Accomplishments

Domestic competitions
 Macedonian Handball Super League
 Winner (15): 1998–99, 2000–01, 2001–02, 2002–03, 2003–04, 2006–07, 2008–09, 2012–13, 2014–15, 2015–16, 2016–17, 2017–18, 2018–19, 2020–2021, 2021-2022

 Macedonian Handball Cup
 Winner (15): 1997, 2000, 2001, 2003, 2004, 2007, 2008, 2012, 2014, 2015, 2016, 2017, 2018, 2021, 2022

 Macedonian Handball Super Cup
 Winner (3): 2017, 2018, 2019

European competitions
 EHF Champions League 
 Winner (2): 2016–17, 2018–19
 EHF Cup Winners' Cup 
 Third placed: 1998–99, 2004–2005, 2010–2011

Other competitions
 SEHA League
 Winner (5): 2011–12, 2013–14, 2016–17, 2017–18, 2018–19
 Runner-up: 2012–13, 2015–16, 2019–20
 IHF Super Globe
 Third placed: 2017, 2019

Individual Club Awards 

 Double
 Winners (9): 2000–01, 2002–03, 2003–04, 2006–07, 2014–15, 2015–16, 2016–17, 2017–18, 2020–21
 Triple Crown
 Winners (1): 2016–17

Arena
RK Vardar is the owner of the Jane Sandanski Arena where they play all their home matches in the EHF Champions League, the regional SEHA League and in domestic competitions. It's a modern complex with a sports hall of 7,500 seats. It has its own hotel, spa center, hospital and swimming pool. 

The arena is named after the Macedonian revolutionary Jane Sandanski.

Team

Current squad
Squad for the 2022–23 season

Goalkeepers
1  Borko Ristovski
 12  Martin Tomovski
 99  Vasil Gogov
Left Wingers
3  Dejan Manaskov
 14  Jan Czuwara
Right Wingers
9  Goce Georgievski 
 45  Darko Đukić 
 77  Alen Kjosevski
Line players
5  Stojanče Stoilov (c)
7  Mihail Alarov
 18  Milan Lazarevski
 55  Stefan Atanasovski

Left Backs
 28  Filip Taleski
 64  Velko Markoski
 97  Marko Miševski
Central Backs
 10  Andrej Dobrković
 11  Martin Karapalevski
 33  Leonardo Dutra 
Right Backs
4  Tomislav Jagurinovski
8  Yoel Cuni Morales

Transfers
Transfers for the season 2023–24

Joining
  Pavel Andreev (P) (back from loan at  HC Meshkov Brest)

Leaving

Staff

Professional staff

Management

Former club members

Notable former players

  Pepi Manaskov
  Stevče Aluševski
  Petar Misovski
  Branislav Angelovski
  Kiril Kolev
  Vančo Dimovski
  Lazo Majnov
  Naumče Mojsovski
  Zlatko Mojsovski
  Goran Kuzmanoski
  Dejan Pecakovski
  Radoslav Stojanović
  Aco Jonovski
  Marjan Kolev
  Mitko Stoilov
  Vlado Nedanovski
  Martin Popovski
  Marko Kizikj
  Dimitar Dimitrioski
  Zlatko Daskalovski
  Nemanja Pribak
  Filip Lazarov
  Velko Markoski
  Milorad Kukoski
  Gradimir Čanevski
  Dejan Manaskov
  Petar Angelov
  Goce Ojleski
  Nikola Markoski
  Milan Levov
  Nikola Mitrevski
  Daniel Gjorgjeski
  Nikola Stojčevski
  Alexey Rastvortsev
  Mikhail Chipurin
  Alexander Dereven 
  Dmitrii Kiselev
  Pavel Atman
  Daniil Shishkarev
  Sergei Gorbok 
  Sergey Gorpishin 
  Gleb Kalarash
  Timur Dibirov
  Strahinja Milić
  Stefan Terzić
  Ilija Abutović
  Mijajlo Marsenić
  Dejan Milosavljev
  Marko Vujin
  Vladimir Petrić
  Janja Vojvodić
  Alem Toskić
  Iñaki Malumbres Aldave
  Alex Dujshebaev
  Arpad Šterbik
  Joan Cañellas
  Jorge Maqueda
  Eduardo Gurbindo
  Blaženko Lacković
  Luka Raković
  Luka Cindrić
  Igor Karačić
  Ivan Čupić
  Lovro Jotić 
  Josip Vekić
  Ante Gadža 
  Mladen Rakčević
  Stevan Vujović 
  Vuk Lazović 
  Vuko Borozan
  Vasko Ševaljević
  Miladin Kozlina 
  Matjaž Brumen
  Gregor Ocvirk
  Staš Skube 
  Domen Sikošek Pelko
  Ante Kuduz
  Revaz Chanturia
  Jan Sobol
  Rogerio Moraes Ferreira
  José Toledo
  Dainis Krištopāns
  Artūrs Kuģis
  Khalifa Ghedbane
  Ali Safar
  Robin Cantegrel
  Bakary Diallo
  Jérémy Toto
  Olivier Nyokas
  Kévynn Nyokas
  Christian Dissinger
  Patryk Walczak

Notable former coaches

  Ljubomir Savevski
  Andon Boškovski
  Zoran Kastratović
  Biljana Crvenkoska
  Stevče Aluševski
  Raúl González Gutiérrez
  David Davis
  Roberto García Parrondo
  David Pisonero 
  Dragan Đukić
  Dejan Perić 
  Josif Petković 
  Veselin Vujović 
  Goran Simić 
  Aleksandar Roganović

Notable former presidents
 Sergey Samsonenko

Kit manufacturers
Hummel International

European competitions record

EHF Champions League

EHF Cup

EHF Cup Winners' Cup

Statistics

All–time Top 10 Scorers in the EHF Champions League
As of 2021–22 season

Most appearances in the EHF Champions League 
As of 2021–22 season

Individual awards in the EHF Champions League

References

External links
 
RFM Profile 
EHF Profile 
 
 http://www.seha-liga.com/klub/11/vardar-skopje

 
Vardar
Sport in Skopje